Cenade is a commune located in Alba County, Transylvania, Romania. It has a population of 1015. It is composed of three villages: Capu Dealului (Hegyitanyák), Cenade and Gorgan.

Ion Agârbiceanu was a native of Cenade.

References

Communes in Alba County
Localities in Transylvania